London Farmers' Markets is an organisation operating certified Farmers' markets in Greater London.

History
The organisation was set up in 1999 by the food writer Nina Planck, based on her experience of selling produce from her family farm at Farmers' Markets in Virginia, USA. The first Farmers' Market set up by LFM in London was in Islington in 1999, quickly followed by Farmers' Markets in Notting Hill, Blackheath, Peckham and Swiss Cottage.

Current status
The Islington Farmers' Market is still running, having moved location more than once. It now takes place on the historic Chapel Market site every Sunday.

There are now 20 Farmers' Markets operated by LFM in London, all of which are certified by FARMA.

LFM-operated farmers' markets
 Balham Farmers' Market
 Blackheath Farmers' Market
 Bloomsbury Farmers' Market
 Brixton Farmers' Market
 Broadgate Farmers' Market
 Ealing Farmers' Market
 Islington Farmers' Market
 London Bridge (Tuesday)
 Marylebone Farmers' Market
 Notting Hill Farmers' Market
 Parliament Hill Farmers' Market
 Parsons' Green Farmers' Market 
 Pimlico Farmers' Market
 Queen's Park Farmers' Market
 South Kensington Farmers' Market Sat Bute St & Tues Imperial College
 Swiss Cottage Farmers' Market
 Twickenham Farmers' Market
 Walthamstow Farmers' Market
 West Hampstead Farmers' Market
 Wimbledon Farmers' Market

Awards
In February 2012, it was announced by FARMA that Queen's Park Farmers' Market was the first Farmers' Market in London to win their Farmers' Market of the Year award, held jointly with Mosely Farmers' Market in Birmingham.

References

External links
 LFM website
 FARMA website

Retail markets in London
Food markets in the United Kingdom
Farmers' markets